The men's pole vault event  at the 1976 European Athletics Indoor Championships was held on 21 February in Munich.

Results

References

Pole vault at the European Athletics Indoor Championships
Pole